Armorel is an unincorporated community and census-designated place (CDP) in Mississippi County, Arkansas, United States. As of the 2020 census, it had a population of 312. It is in a largely rural area with most of its land devoted to forests and farms. Most of the town lies between Arkansas highways 18 and 312.

The town was founded in 1899 by lumber magnate and president of Lee Wilson and Company, R.E.L. Wilson as one of his many company holdings. Wilson was an eclectic and colorful figure with vast land holdings in the Delta area after the Civil War. Also a proponent of education, Wilson was one of the original trustees of Arkansas State University, then A & M College. He sat on the board from 1917 until his death in 1933.

The town's name was formed from the abbreviations of Arkansas and Missouri, along with the first three initials of its founder, Wilson.

Education 
Public education for early childhood, elementary and secondary education is available from the Armorel School District, that leads to graduation from Armorel High School.

Demographics

2020 census

Note: the US Census treats Hispanic/Latino as an ethnic category. This table excludes Latinos from the racial categories and assigns them to a separate category. Hispanics/Latinos can be of any race.

See also 
 Marie, Arkansas: company town founded by R.E.L. Wilson
 Victoria, Arkansas: company town founded by R.E.L. Wilson
 Wilson, Arkansas: company town founded by R.E.L. Wilson

References

External links
 Biography of   R.E.L. Wilson, founder of Armorel, and of Lee Wilson & Co.
 Armorel Public Schools homepage
 Armorel-Huffman Volunteer Fire Dept.  homepage

Unincorporated communities in Arkansas
Unincorporated communities in Mississippi County, Arkansas
Census-designated places in Arkansas
Census-designated places in Mississippi County, Arkansas
Populated places established in 1899
1899 establishments in Arkansas
Company towns in Arkansas